Edwards Pond is a small lake north-northeast of Horton in Delaware County, New York. Little Fuller Brook enters the lake from the northeast. It then drains west via Little Fuller Brook which flows into Horton Brook.

See also
 List of lakes in New York

References 

Lakes of New York (state)
Lakes of Delaware County, New York